Magnolia boliviana is a tree in the family Magnoliaceae native to the rainforests of the eastern Andean foothills of Bolivia.

Description 
Magnolia boliviana is a tree of 30 m with a trunk of 50–75 cm in diameter. The smooth ovate-elliptic leaves are 12–29 cm long and 7.5–12 cm wide. The flowers have 6 obovate white petals ca. 6 cm long; the ovoid fruit can be 11–14 cm long. It is known as granadilla.

Distribution and habitat 
In Bolivia, in rainforests in elevations between 200–500 meters. It is reported to occur in Isiboro Secure National Park, Arroyo Negro National Park and Madidi National Park.

Conservation 
The IUCN has assigned it the endangered conservation status. It is threatened by habitat loss due to timber harvesting and clearance of forests for the production of cocaine.

References 

boliviana
Vulnerable plants
Trees of Bolivia
Taxonomy articles created by Polbot